Manuel Miquel may refer to:
Manuel Miquel Rodríguez (1812-1879), Chilean politician
Manu Miquel (born 1994), Spanish footballer